École secondaire participative l'Agora is a public French-language alternative secondary school in Longueuil, Quebec, Canada. Its address is 482 Springfield Street in the borough of Greenfield Park. It offers concentrations in Drama, Cinema and Popular music.

References

External links
École secondaire participative l'Agora 

High schools in Longueuil
Educational institutions established in 1995
1995 establishments in Quebec